The 1999 ASB Classic doubles was the doubles event of the fourteenth edition of the ASB Classic; a WTA Tier IV tournament and the most prestigious women's tennis tournament held in New Zealand. Nana Miyagi and Tamarine Tanasugarn were the defending champions but did not compete that year.

Silvia Farina and Barbara Schett lost in the final 6–2, 7–6(7–2) against Seda Noorlander and Marlene Weingärtner.

Seeds

Draw

Qualifying

Seeds

Qualifiers
 ''' Anca Barna /  Karin Miller

Qualifying draw

External links
 ITF tournament edition details

WTA Auckland Open
ASB Classic